Ataxic respiration is an abnormal pattern of breathing characterized by complete irregularity of breathing, with irregular pauses and increasing periods of apnea. As the breathing pattern deteriorates, it merges with agonal respiration.

Cause
It is caused by damage to the medulla oblongata due to strokes or trauma. It generally indicates a poor prognosis, and usually progresses to complete apnea.

The term is sometimes used interchangeably with Biot's respiration.

Treatment 
It is believed that intensive care technology may be masking the presence of Biot’s Respirations.  This could be related to the fact that treatment for Biot’s Respirations typically results with intubation immediately upon diagnosis, with mechanical ventilation to regulate patients’ breathing.

References

External links
About brain injury and functions

Breathing abnormalities